Roxie Collie Simpson Laybourne (September 15, 1910 – August 7, 2003) was an American ornithologist born in Fayetteville, North Carolina. She pioneered the study of forensic ornithology while at the National Museum of Natural History; these forensic techniques for identifying species of birds involved in bird strikes led to aircraft safety improvements.

Early life 
Laybourne was raised in Farmville, North Carolina. She was the eldest of 15. When she was young she preferred playing baseball to other activities such as learning to sew.

Education and career
Laybourne earned her B.A. from Meredith College in 1932 and her M.S. in plant ecology from George Washington University in 1951 with a thesis on mosses. She worked for the North Carolina State Museum of Natural History in its taxidermy and exhibit departments in 1932, as well as the National Fisheries Laboratory, the United States National Museum from 1944 to 1946, and the Bird and Mammal Laboratories of the U.S. Fish and Wildlife Service from 1946 to 1974, before retiring and joining the National Museum of Natural History as a research associate. While at the National Museum of Natural History, Laybourne pioneered the study of forensic ornithology. She worked as a feather specialist for the Smithsonian Institution.

During her career, Laybourne developed "the speciality of identifying dead birds from their feathers to learn what types of birds struck planes." This information was instrumental in safety improvements within the manufacturing of aircraft engines, the development of military fighter canopies, and the creation of runway management plans. Laybourne's skills in forensic ornithology helped solve around 1,000 cases of bird-related airplane incidents a year.

In addition to her employers, Laybourne's expertise aided the Federal Aviation Administration, the Federal Bureau of Investigation, General Electric, the National Transportation Safety Board, Pratt and Whitney, and Rolls-Royce.

Awards and honors
Laybourne's work was recognized by the Air Force Bird Strike Committee in 1966 with its lifetime achievement award.

References

External links
 Correspondence, 1962-2003 via National Museum of Natural History
 Field notes, 1950, 1975-1984 via Smithsonian Institution Archives
 Oral history interviews, 2001 via Smithsonian Institution Archives
 Roxie Collie Laybourne memorial via National Museum of Natural History
 Podcast about Laybourne
 Profile at Bionomia, linking to specimens collected and identified by Laybourne

1910 births
2003 deaths
American ornithologists
Women ornithologists
20th-century American women scientists
Smithsonian Institution people
People from Fayetteville, North Carolina
Scientists from North Carolina
Meredith College alumni
George Washington University alumni
20th-century American zoologists